Cyril Charles William White  (7 September 1909 – 5 July 1984) was a New Zealand piano tuner and repairer, advocate and worker for the blind. He was born in Hastings, New Zealand, in 1909.

In the 1975 Queen's Birthday Honours, White was appointed an Officer of the Order of the British Empire, for services to the blind, especially the Royal New Zealand Foundation for the Blind.

References

1909 births
1984 deaths
New Zealand musicians
New Zealand activists
People from Hastings, New Zealand
Piano tuners
New Zealand Officers of the Order of the British Empire